Kalyady Tsars ( - Christmas Tsars) is a ritual and festive event celebrated in Siemiežava village, Minsk Region, Belarus. In 2009, it was inscribed on the UNESCO List of Intangible Cultural Heritage in Need of Urgent Safeguarding.

See also
 Tsar Maximilian

References

External links

 Rite of the Kalyady Tsars (Christmas Tsars) // unesco.org
 

Intangible Cultural Heritage in Need of Urgent Safeguarding
Folk plays